Christian Sukke (born 21 January 1993) is a Norwegian footballer who plays as a goalkeeper for Østsiden IL.

He hails from Spydeberg. He played youth football for Askim and Moss before joining Sarpsborg 08. He reached the senior team bench for the first time in 2011, and made his first-team debut in 2013. He signed a professional contract in 2012.

After playing on loan for Sogndal in 2015, he went on to his old youth club Moss ahead of the 2016 season. In 2019 he joined seventh-tier club Rolvsøy, scoring a dozen goals in the #1 jersey. Ahead of the 2020 season he joined Østsiden IL.

Career statistics

References

1993 births
Living people
People from Spydeberg
Norwegian footballers
Sarpsborg 08 FF players
Sogndal Fotball players
Moss FK players
Østsiden IL players
Norwegian First Division players
Eliteserien players
Norway under-21 international footballers
Association football goalkeepers
Sportspeople from Viken (county)